The Coast of Opportunity is a 1920 American silent western drama film directed by Ernest C. Warde and starring J. Warren Kerrigan, Herschel Mayall and Fritzi Brunette.

Cast
 J. Warren Kerrigan as Dick Bristow
 Herschel Mayall as Julien Marr
 Fritzi Brunette as Janet Ashley
 Edward Hearn as Tommy De Boer
 Flora Hollister as Rosita 
 Carl Stockdale as Marr's Private Secretary
 William V. Mong as An Old Miner

References

Bibliography
 Munden, Kenneth White. The American Film Institute Catalog of Motion Pictures Produced in the United States, Part 1. University of California Press, 1997.

External links
 

1920 films
1920 drama films
1920s English-language films
American silent feature films
Silent American drama films
Silent American Western (genre) films
American black-and-white films
Films directed by Ernest C. Warde
Films distributed by W. W. Hodkinson Corporation
1920s American films